Earthy is an album by the Prestige All Stars nominally led by guitarist Kenny Burrell recorded in 1957 and released on the Prestige label.

Reception 
The Allmusic site awarded the album 4½ stars stating "Dazzling stints by Kenny Burrell (g), Art Farmer (tpt), and Mal Waldron (p) on otherwise standard cuts".

Track listing 
All compositions by Mal Waldron except where noted
 "Earthy" - 9:24  
 "What's Not" - 7:10  
 "I Wouldn't" (Hal McKusick) - 6:13  
 "The Front Line" (McKusick) - 6:11  
 "Dayee" (Kenny Burrell) - 14:33

Personnel 
Kenny Burrell - guitar
Al Cohn - tenor saxophone
Art Farmer - trumpet
Hal McKusick - alto saxophone
Mal Waldron - piano 
Teddy Kotick - bass
Ed Thigpen - drums

References 

Kenny Burrell albums
1957 albums
Albums produced by Bob Weinstock
Albums recorded at Van Gelder Studio
Prestige Records albums